The following is a list of notable deaths in January 2015.

Entries for each day are listed alphabetically by surname. A typical entry lists information in the following sequence:
Name, age, country of citizenship and reason for notability, established cause of death, reference.

January 2015

1
Barbara Atkinson, 88, British actress (Z-Cars).
Staryl C. Austin, 94, American air force brigadier general.
Ulrich Beck, 70, German sociologist, heart attack.
Fiona Cumming, 77, British television director (Doctor Who).
Eric Cunningham, 65, Canadian politician, Ontario MPP for Wentworth North (1975–1984).
Mario Cuomo, 82, American politician, Governor of New York (1983–1994), heart failure.
Donna Douglas, 82, American actress (The Beverly Hillbillies, Frankie and Johnny, The Twilight Zone), pancreatic cancer.
Matthew Franjola, 72, American journalist (Associated Press) and photographer.
Jeff Golub, 59, American guitarist, progressive supranuclear palsy.
Jack Howell, 88, British physician.
Omar Karami, 80, Lebanese politician, Prime Minister (1990–1992, 2004–2005).
Bill Keating, 70, American football player (Denver Broncos, Miami Dolphins) and attorney.
Tore Helge Larsen, 69, Norwegian harness racer, cancer.
Géry Leuliet, 104, French Roman Catholic prelate, world's oldest Catholic bishop, Bishop of Amiens (1963–1985).
Boris Morukov, 64, Russian physician and cosmonaut, STS-106 mission specialist.
Kjell Noreik, 85, Norwegian physician.
*Mrunalini Devi Puar, 83, Indian educator, Chancellor of the Maharaja Sayajirao University of Baroda (since 1988).
Ninón Sevilla, 93, Cuban-born Mexican actress (Aventurera, La usurpadora), heart attack.
William Lloyd Standish, 84, American federal judge, District Court Judge for the Western District of Pennsylvania (1987–2002).
Manasa Vaniqi, 62, Fijian civil servant and lieutenant colonel, Permanent Secretary for Sugar (since 2009).
Miller Williams, 84, American poet, Alzheimer's disease.

2
Per-Olof Åstrand, 92, Swedish physiologist.
James A. Barlow, 91, American politician, member of the Wyoming House of Representatives (1983–1987).
Charles Baur, 85, French politician, President of the Regional Council of Picardy (1976–1978, 1985–2004).
Noel Cobb, 76, American-born British philosopher, psychologist and author.
Little Jimmy Dickens, 94, American country music singer ("May the Bird of Paradise Fly Up Your Nose"), cardiac arrest.
Baldina Di Vittorio, 94, Italian politician.
Danny Dunton, 90, English speedway rider and promoter.
Maurice Fontaine, 95, French politician.
Bob Gilmore, 53, British musicologist.
Vasant Gowarikar, 81, Indian scientist and ISRO chairman, dengue and urinary tract infection.
Basil Hansen, 88, Australian Olympic ice hockey player (1960).
Lloyd House, 83, American politician, member of the Arizona House of Representatives (1967–1968).
*Lam Pou-chuen, 63, Hong Kong dubbing artist (Doraemon), diabetes.
*Abu Anas al-Libi, 50, Libyan al-Qaeda member in United States custody, liver cancer.
John McQuilten, 65, Australian politician, member of the Victorian Legislative Council for Ballarat (1999–2006).
Derek Minter, 82, British Grand Prix motorcycle and short-circuit road racer.
Arthur Neu, 81, American politician, Lieutenant Governor of Iowa (1973–1979), member of the Iowa Senate (1967–1973).
Tihomir Novakov, 85, Serbian-born American physicist.
Billy O'Neill, 85, Irish sportsman.
István Pásztor, 89, Hungarian Olympic cyclist (1952).
Dan Poulin, 57, Canadian ice hockey player (Minnesota North Stars), cancer.
Arpád Račko, 84, Hungarian-born Slovak sculptor.
Vincent Cartledge Reddish, 88, Scottish astronomer, Astronomer Royal for Scotland (1975–1980).
Kristian Sundtoft, 77, Norwegian politician.

3
*Jamal Uddin Ahmad, 85, Bangladeshi politician, Deputy Prime Minister (1977–1982).
Daniel Albright, 69, American academic.
Martin Anderson, 78, American economist and political adviser.
Adunni Bankole, 55, Nigerian businesswoman, heart attack.
Edward Brooke, 95, American politician, member of the U.S. Senate from Massachusetts (1967–1979).
Bryan Caldwell, 54, American football player (Houston Oilers), Hodgkin's lymphoma.
Paulinus Costa, 78, Bangladeshi Roman Catholic prelate, Archbishop of Dhaka (2005–2011), heart attack.
Maher Hathout, 79, Egyptian-born American Islamic leader, cancer.
Dwight Hooker, 86, American photographer (Playboy) and architect.
Bill Jessup, 85, American football player (San Francisco 49ers).
Rueben Philip Job, 86, American United Methodist prelate, Bishop of the Iowa episcopal area (1984–1992).
Muath al-Kasasbeh, 26, Jordanian fighter pilot and ISIS hostage, burned alive.
Roger Kitter, 65, British actor ('Allo 'Allo!) and entertainer, cancer.<ref>[https://www.independent.co.uk/news/people/news/roger-kitter-stand-up-comedian-and-actor-best-known-for-taking-over-the-role-of-captain-bertorelli-10147286.html Roger Kitter: Stand-up comedian and actor best known for taking over the role of Captain Bertorelli in Allo 'Allo!]</ref>
Olga Knyazeva, 60, Russian fencer, Olympic champion (1976).
Willy Ovesen, 90, Norwegian civil servant.
Terence Ranger, 85, British historian.
Jaime Romero Móran, 22, Mexican gymnast, shot.
Allie Sherman, 91, American football player (Philadelphia Eagles) and coach (New York Giants).
Jouko Törmänen, 60, Finnish ski jumper, Olympic champion (1980).

4
*Chang Sung-hwan, 94, South Korean lieutenant general and diplomat, Chief of Staff of the Air Force (1962–1964), natural causes.
Elisabetta Catalano, 70, Italian fine-art photographer.
Pino Daniele, 59, Italian singer and songwriter, heart attack.
Chitresh Das, 70, Indian dancer, instructor and choreographer, aneurysm.
Al Delugach, 89, American Pulitzer Prize-winning reporter, mesothelioma.
Lance Diamond, 69, American singer, heart complications.
Jay Furman, 72, American real estate developer, cancer.
He Zhenliang, 85, Chinese politician and diplomat.
Dan Held, 53, Canadian ice hockey player.
Gene Kemp, 88, British children's author (The Turbulent Term of Tyke Tiler).
Haroldo Lara, 80, Brazilian Olympic swimmer (1952, 1956).
Azizullah Lodin, 75–76, Afghan politician.
John McPhee, 77, Scottish footballer (Blackpool, Motherwell).
Stu Miller, 87, American baseball player (San Francisco Giants, Baltimore Orioles).
Juan Isidro Moreno, 90, Dominican Republic poet.
Hasan Hazer Moshar, 91, Iranian artist.
Jack Parr, 78, American basketball player (Cincinnati Royals).
Natalino Pescarolo, 85, Italian Roman Catholic prelate, Bishop of Fossano (1992–2005) and Cuneo (1999–2005).
Hank Peters, 90, American baseball executive (Baltimore Orioles), complications from a stroke.
Ahuti Prasad, 57, Indian actor, colon cancer.
Ives Roqueta, 78, French Occitan author.
Eli Sagan, 87, American clothing manufacturer, cultural anthropology author and Nixon Enemy.
Stuart Scott, 49, American sports journalist (SportsCenter), appendix cancer.
Michele Serros, 48, American novelist and poet, adenocarcinoma of the salivary gland.
Nelson Torno, 87, Argentine Olympic sports shooter.
Upendra Trivedi, 78, Indian actor and director.
Richard D. Veltri, 79, American politician, member of the Connecticut House of Representatives.
René Vautier, 86, French film director (Avoir 20 ans dans les Aurès).
Bernard Williams, 72, British film producer (A Clockwork Orange, Daredevil, Flash Gordon), cancer.
Edmund Wnuk-Lipiński, 70, Polish academic.
János Zsombolyai, 75, Hungarian cinematographer, film director and screenwriter.

5
Joy Ali, 36, Fijian middleweight boxer, suicide.
Philippe Baillet, 74, French Olympic basketball player.
Allan Beard, 95, British civil servant.
Jean-Pierre Beltoise, 77, French Formula One racing driver, winner of the 1972 Monaco Grand Prix, stroke.
Al Bendich, 85, American civil rights attorney.
Khan Bonfils, 42, English actor (Star Wars: Episode I – The Phantom Menace, Batman Begins, Skyfall).
Jim Burton, 53, Canadian ice hockey player (Hershey Bears) and coach, heart attack.
Jack Calmes, 71, American inventor, executive and musician.
Eylül Cansın, 24, Turkish transgender woman, suicide by jumping.
Bobby Carter, 75, American politician, member of the Tennessee Senate (1995–2002).
William R. Catton, Jr., 88, American environmental sociologist.
Arthur E. Chase, 84, American politician, member of the Massachusetts Senate (1991–1995).
Albert Firth, 77, English rugby league player (Wakefield Trinity).
Antonio Fuertes, 85, Spanish footballer (Valencia, Elche).
Vadim Glovatsky, 45, Kazakhstani Olympic ice hockey player (1998), (Metallurg Magnitogorsk).
Joe Haines, 91, American politician, member of the Ohio House of Representatives (1981–1999).
Ken Hale, 75, English football player and manager.
Niels Hansen, 90, German diplomat.
Milton Hebald, 97, American sculptor.
Martin Joseph, 65, Trinidadian politician, Minister of National Security (2003–2010), drowned.
Mustafa Kamal, 81, Bangladeshi judge, Chief Justice (1999), heart disease.
Anthony Ledwith, 81, British chemist.
Earl MacNaughton, 95, Canadian physicist.
Bernard Joseph McLaughlin, 102, American Roman Catholic prelate, Auxiliary Bishop of Buffalo (1968–1988).
Harold Murphy, 76, American politician, member of the Illinois House of Representatives (1993–2003).
Ganesh Patro, 69, Indian playwright and screenwriter, cancer.
Alfons Peeters, 71, Belgian footballer.
Joan Peters, 78, American author (From Time Immemorial), complications from a stroke.
King Sporty, 71, Jamaican-American reggae musician.
Geoff Truett, 79, English footballer (Crystal Palace).

6
Anton Amann, 58, Austrian chemist.
Else M. Barth, 86, Norwegian philosopher.
Vlastimil Bubník, 83, Czech ice hockey player and footballer, Olympic bronze medalist (1964).
*Buffalo Tiger, 94, American politician, Chairman of the Miccosukee Tribe of Indians of Florida (1962–1985).
Joseph Djida, 69, Cameroonian Roman Catholic prelate, Bishop of Ngaoundéré (since 2000).
Johannes de Villiers Graaff, 86, South African economist.
Lawrence Gushee, 83, American musicologist.
Jean Hendriks, 89, Dutch politician, member of the Senate (1981–1991).
Francesca Hilton, 67, American actress and socialite, stroke.
Ron Hovey, 82, Australian football player (Geelong).
Arthur Jackson, 96, American sports shooter.
Sir John Mason, 91, British meteorologist.
George H. McKee, 91, American air force lieutenant general.
Lance Percival, 81, British actor (That Was the Week That Was, The Beatles) and singer ("Shame and Scandal in the Family").
Gilberto Perez, 71, Cuban-born American professor of film studies.
Sanford E. Reisenbach, 82, American marketing executive (Warner Bros.).
Patricia Roppel, 76, American historian and teacher, specialist in the history of Southeast Alaska, cancer.
Thunder Rumble, 26, American Thoroughbred racehorse, complications from colic.
Alexandru Segal, 67, Romanian-born Brazilian economist and chess player.

7
Subhas Anandan, 67, Indian-born Singaporean lawyer, heart failure.
José Arias, 92, Spanish Olympic alpine skier (1948).
Tim Arson, 38, American professional wrestler (WWC, ECW).
Ricardo Bueno Fernández, 74, Spanish politician, member of the Senate (1977–1979, 1993–2000) and Congress of Deputies (2000–2004).
John Burritt, 80, American Olympic biathlete.
Gilbert Finn, 94, Canadian businessman, Lieutenant Governor of New Brunswick (1987–1994).
Michael Fisher, 68, British solicitor, cancer.
Tadeusz Konwicki, 88, Polish writer and filmmaker.
Mompati Merafhe, 78, Botswanan lieutenant general and politician, Vice President (2008–2012).
Arch A. Moore, Jr., 91, American politician, Governor of West Virginia (1969–1977, 1985–1989).
J. P. Parisé, 73, Canadian ice hockey player (Minnesota North Stars), lung cancer.
Jethro Pugh, 70, American football player (Dallas Cowboys).
Archie Radebe, 55, South African footballer (AmaZulu) and coach.
B. S. Abdur Rahman, 87, Indian business executive and philanthropist (B. S. Abdur Rahman University).
David Rolfe, 50, Australian Paralympic swimmer, complications relating to heart surgery.
Julio Scherer García, 88, Mexican journalist, septic shock.
Herb Simpson, 94, American baseball player (Seattle Steelheads).
Rod Taylor, 84, Australian actor (The Time Machine, The Birds, 101 Dalmatians, Inglourious Basterds), heart attack.
Nancy Thomas, 96, British television producer (Monitor).

Notable French people killed in the Charlie Hebdo shooting:
Cabu, 76, cartoonist
Elsa Cayat, 54, psychoanalyst and columnist
Charb, 47, caricaturist and journalist
Philippe Honoré, 73, cartoonist
Bernard Maris, 68, economist and journalist
Tignous, 57, cartoonist
Georges Wolinski, 80, cartoonist

8
Fernando Argila, 92, Spanish footballer.
William E. Boeing Jr., 92, American businessman.
Andraé Crouch, 72, American gospel singer, heart attack.
Kep Enderby, 88, Australian politician and judge, MP (1970–1975), Supreme Court Justice of New South Wales (1982–1992).
Patsy Garrett, 93, American singer and actress (Benji, Nanny and the Professor, Room 222).
Jean-Claude Gasigwa, 31, Rwandan tennis player (Davis Cup team).
Peter Hill, 83, English footballer (Coventry City).
Jenő Lasztovicza, 53, Hungarian politician, MP (since 1998).
Curtis Lee, 75, American singer ("Pretty Little Angel Eyes"), cancer.
Hubert Markl, 76, German biologist.
Ray McFall, 88, British nightclub owner (The Cavern Club).
Roy McKie, 93, American illustrator.
Richard Meade, 76, British equestrian, three-time Olympic champion, cancer.
Remo Pianezzi, 87, Swiss cyclist.
Henryk Podlewski, 94, Polish psychiatrist.
Leif Rantala, 67, Finnish linguist.
Erbey Satterfield, 75, American politician, member of the Utah House of Representatives.
Egil Toreng, 92, Norwegian newspaper editor and politician.
Nelson Townsend, 73, American athletic director (Florida A&M), heart attack.

9
Angelo Anquilletti, 71, Italian footballer (A.C. Milan, national team).
Jasodhara Bagchi, 77, Indian feminist critic and academic.
Amedy Coulibaly, 32, French jihadist, shot.
Harry A. DeMaso, 93, American politician, member of the Michigan Senate (1967–1986).
Samuel Goldwyn Jr., 88, American film producer (The Secret Life of Walter Mitty, Master and Commander: The Far Side of the World, The Preacher's Wife), heart failure.
Ah Chew Goo, 96, American basketball player and coach (University of Hawaii).
Michel Jeury, 80, French science fiction author.
Sonny Karnofsky, 92, American football player (Philadelphia Eagles).
Robert V. Keeley, 85, American diplomat, Ambassador to Mauritius (1976–1978), Zimbabwe (1980–1984) and Greece (1985–1989), stroke.
Sarah Kemp, 77, Australian actress (Sons and Daughters), lung cancer.
Chuck Locke, 82, American baseball player (Baltimore Orioles).
Frans Molenaar, 74, Dutch fashion designer, complications from a fall.
Józef Oleksy, 68, Polish politician, Prime Minister (1995–1996), cancer.
Bud Paxson, 79, American media executive, co-founder of the Home Shopping Network, founder of Pax TV.
Peder Pedersen, 69, Danish track cyclist, Olympic champion (1968).
*Abdul Rahman Ya'kub, 87, Malaysian politician, Chief Minister of Sarawak (1970–1981).
Whitney Reed, 82, American tennis player.
James L. Reveal, 73, American botanist.
Robert Scott, 73, American author.
Iqbal Sheikh, 80, Pakistani cricketer.
Bud Sherman, 88, Canadian politician, member of the Legislative Assembly of Manitoba (1969–1984), member of the House of Commons (1965–1968).
Miroslav Soviš, 60, Czech Olympic biathlete.
Paul M. Starnes, 80, American politician, member of the Tennessee House of Representatives (1972–1990).
Roy Tarpley, 50, American basketball player (Dallas Mavericks).
Christian Vannequé, 65, French sommelier and restaurateur.

10
John Angus, 66, New Zealand children's rights advocate, children's commissioner (2009–2011).
Jorgelina Aranda, 72, Argentine model and actress (Il Gaucho).
Robert Berner, 79, American geologist and geochemist.
Walter Berns, 95, American constitutional law and political philosophy professor.
Frans Bolweg, 64, Dutch sailor and coach.
Brian Clemens, 83, British screenwriter (Dr. Jekyll and Sister Hyde) and television producer (The Avengers, The Professionals).
Abed Daoudieh, 94, Jordanian politician, Awqaf and Islamic Affairs Minister (1984).
George Dickerson, 81, American actor (Blue Velvet, Hill Street Blues).
James R. Dixon, 86, American herpetologist.
Tim Drummond, 74, American bassist (Bob Dylan, Neil Young).
Pierre-André Fournier, 71, Canadian Roman Catholic prelate, Archbishop of Rimouski (since 2008).
Elemér Hankiss, 86, Hungarian sociologist.
Maeve Hillery, 91, Irish physician.
Jim Hogan, 81, Irish Olympic long-distance runner, European champion (1966).
Harry V. Jaffa, 96, American political philosophy professor.
Annis Jensen, 93, American roller derby skater.
Frederik H. Kreuger, 86, Dutch high voltage scientist.
Junior Malanda, 20, Belgian footballer (VfL Wolfsburg, national under-21 team), traffic collision.
Marko Marin, 84, Slovenian theatre director and art historian.
Slobodan Martinović, 70, Serbian chess player.
Roger Moyer, 80, American politician, Mayor of Annapolis, Maryland (1965–1973), Parkinson's disease.
Yoko Nagae Ceschina, 82, Japanese classical music philanthropist.
Taylor Negron, 57, American comedian and actor (Angels in the Outfield, Fast Times at Ridgemont High, Bio-Dome), liver cancer.
Margit Nünke, 84, German fashion model, actress and beauty queen.
Ged Peck, 67, English musician.
Hugh Peery, 83, American Olympic wrestler.
George Probert, 87, American jazz musician and music editor.
Francesco Rosi, 92, Italian film director (The Mattei Affair, Christ Stopped at Eboli, Salvatore Giuliano).
Francis Simard, 67, Canadian revolution activist and criminal, aneurysm.
Hans Stoiber, 96, Austrian poet.
Robert Stone, 77, American novelist (Dog Soldiers), chronic obstructive pulmonary disease.
Denis Tsygurov, 43, Russian professional ice hockey player (Buffalo Sabres, Los Angeles Kings).
Inge Vermeulen, 30, Brazilian-born Dutch field hockey player (national team), European champion (2009).
Roger Wosahlo, 67, English footballer (Peterborough), cancer.

11
Jenő Buzánszky, 89, Hungarian footballer (Dorogi FC, national team), Olympic champion (1952), last living member of the Golden Team.
Gary Dighton, 46, British Olympic cyclist, suicide.
Doriemus, 24, New Zealand Thoroughbred racehorse, Melbourne Cup winner (1995), euthanised following paddock accident.
Anita Ekberg, 83, Swedish-Italian actress (La Dolce Vita, Paris Holiday, Back from Eternity).
*Chashi Nazrul Islam, 73, Bangladeshi filmmaker (Ora Egaro Jon).
Chic Littlewood, 84, British-born New Zealand television personality and actor (King Kong, 30 Days of Night).
Albert McPherson, 87, English football player (Walsall) and coach (West Bromwich Albion).
Vernon Benjamin Mountcastle, 96, American professor emeritus (Johns Hopkins School of Medicine) and neuroscientist.
Fritz Pott, 75, German football player and coach.
Bruno Visintin, 82, Italian boxer, Olympic bronze medalist (1952).
Ryszard Zub, 80, Polish fencer, Olympic silver (1956, 1960) and bronze (1964) medalist.

12
John Bayley, 89, British literary critic and writer.
Bonnie Christensen, 63, American children's book author and illustrator, ovarian cancer.
Germán Cobos, 87, Spanish actor.
Trevor Colbourn, 87, Australian educator and academic, President of the University of Central Florida (1978–1989).
James Naanman Daman, 58, Nigerian Roman Catholic prelate, Bishop of Jalingo (2000–2007) and Shendam (since 2007).
Stephen Gold, 58, British computer journalist, complications of heart surgery.
Robert Gover, 85, American author.
John Hill, 69, American game designer, heart failure.
Akira Kinoshita, 78, Japanese photographer.
Carl Long, 79, American baseball player.
William C. Martel, 59, American political scientist, cancer.
A. J. Masters, 64, American singer and songwriter, prostate cancer.
Paul Morgan, 40, Welsh rugby union and league player.
Elena Obraztsova, 75, Russian mezzo-soprano.
Alex Omes, 43, American nightlife impresario, co-founder of Ultra Music Festival.
V. B. Rajendra Prasad, 82, Indian film producer and director.
Gabriel Ramushwana, 73, South African general, Head of State of Venda (1990–1994), colon cancer.
Ed Skinner, 78, American politician and attorney, member of the Iowa House of Representatives (1969–1973).
Darrell Winfield, 85, American rancher and model, Marlboro Man (1968–1989).

13
Robert Boon, 98, Dutch-born American actor (Queen of Blood, Verboten!, The Twilight Zone).
Chuck Burr, 91, American football executive, general manager for the Miami Dolphins.
Tony Ciprian, 82, New Zealand television sports presenter and producer.
Doug Cunningham, 69, American football player (Ole Miss Rebels, San Francisco 49ers).
Robert Dotson, 91, American flatfoot dancer.
Ralph Faudree, 75, American mathematician.
Frank Glazer, 99, American pianist and composer.
Sir Jack Hayward, 91, English businessman, property developer and philanthropist, president of Wolverhampton Wanderers.
Mark Juddery, 43, Australian author and journalist, cancer.
H. Wesley Kenney, 89, American television director and producer (General Hospital, All in the Family, The Young and the Restless), cardiac arrest.
Mike Marqusee, 61, American-born writer and activist, multiple myeloma.
Frank Mazzola, 79, American film actor and editor (Rebel Without a Cause, Casablanca, The Hunchback of Notre Dame).
Hara Patnaik, 56, Indian actor and film director, cancer.
Ronnie Ronalde, 91, British music hall singer and siffleur.
Isabel Rosado, 107, Puerto Rican independence activist (Puerto Rican Nationalist Party).
John H. Rubel, 94, American defense electronics executive.
Bill Thompson, 70, American talent manager, heart attack.
Jane Wilson, 90, American painter.
Keith Wright, 73, Australian politician and convicted child rapist, MP for Capricornia (1984–1993).
Hillel Zaks, 85, Polish-born Israeli rabbi.

14
Mordechai Shmuel Ashkenazi, 71, Israeli rabbi.
Bob Boyd, 84, American basketball coach (USC Trojans).
Jerry Dempsey, 81, American politician, member of the Minnesota House of Representatives (1992–2006).
Bill Dodd, 78, English footballer (Burnley F.C.).
Lotte Hass, 86, Austrian model and underwater diver.
Val Holten, 87, Australian cricketer.
Danny Malloy, 84, Scottish footballer (Cardiff City, Dundee).
Jerzy Holzer, 84, Polish historian.
Susanto Pudjomartono, 71, Indonesian newspaper editor and diplomat, second chief editor of The Jakarta Post (1991–2003), Ambassador to Russia (2003–2008).
Nélida Romero, 88, Argentine actress.
Darren Shahlavi, 42, English actor (Night at the Museum, Watchmen, Ip Man 2) and martial artist, heart attack.
Obrad Sretenović, 79, Croatian Olympic boxer.
Layne Tom Jr., 87, American actor (Charlie Chan series).
Warren Weinstein, 73, American economist, USAID contractor kidnapped by al-Qaeda, drone strike.
Robert White, 88, American diplomat, United States Ambassador to Paraguay (1977–1980) and El Salvador (1980–1981).
Zhang Wannian, 86, Chinese general.

15
*Bai Jinian, 88, Chinese politician, party chief of Shaanxi Province.
Jean-Claude Baker, 71, French-born American restaurateur, suicide.
Ludmila Brožová-Polednová, 93, Czech prosecutor, participated in the show trial of Milada Horáková.
Arnaldo Calveyra, 85, Argentine poet and novelist, heart attack.
Eugene E. Covert, 88, American aeronautics engineer.
Ervin Drake, 95, American songwriter ("It Was a Very Good Year", "I Believe", "Good Morning Heartache"), bladder cancer.
Kim Fowley, 75, American record producer, band manager (The Runaways), impresario and musician, bladder cancer.
Alan Hirschfield, 79, American film executive, CEO of Columbia Pictures (1973–1978), Chairman of 20th Century Fox (1982–1986).
Mirko Holbus, 74, Serbian Olympic ice hockey player.
Anwarul Iqbal, 64, Bangladeshi politician and police chief, cardiac arrest.
Archibald Kennedy, 8th Marquess of Ailsa, 58, Scottish peer, hereditary chief of Clan Kennedy.
Karel Lichtnégl, 78, Czech football player.
Jean Lindenmann, 90, Swiss virologist and immunologist, co-discoverer of interferon.
Rimma Markova, 89, Russian actress.
Ray Nagel, 87, American football player (UCLA Bruins) and coach (Utah Utes, Iowa Hawkeyes).
Chikao Ohtsuka, 85, Japanese voice actor (Lupin III, Sonic the Hedgehog, One Piece), ischemic heart failure.
Raoul Pantin, 71, Trinidadian journalist, playwright, and screenwriter (Bim), survivor of the Jamaat al Muslimeen coup attempt.
Robert S. Pirie, 80, American lawyer.
Ignacio Posada, 79, Colombian Olympic fencer.
Harvey Sweetman, 93, New Zealand World War II pilot.
Rameshwar Thakur, 88, Indian politician, Governor of Odisha (2004–2006), Andhra Pradesh (2006–2007) and Karnataka (2007–2009).
Walter Westbrook, 93, South African artist.
Bob Wilson, 85, American sportscaster (Boston Bruins).
Joseph Mukasa Zuza, 59, Malawian Roman Catholic prelate, Bishop of Mzuzu (since 1995), traffic collision.

16
Miriam Akavia, 87, Israeli writer.
Sir Ian Athfield, 74, New Zealand architect, pneumonia.
Mohamed Olow Barrow, Somali politician.
Andrew Benson, 97, American biologist.
José Carrasco, 71, Peruvian politician, Minister of Energy and Mines (1988–1989) and member of the Congress (2006–2011), lung cancer.
Vivaldo Frota, 86, Brazilian politician, Governor of Amazonas (1990–1991).
Ted Harrison, 88, British-born Canadian painter.
Pedro María Iguaran, 74, Spanish footballer (Real Sociedad).
Patrick Journoud, 50, French Olympic athlete (1988).
Stuart Loory, 82, American journalist and media executive (CNN), lung cancer.
Ray Lumpp, 91, American basketball player (New York Knicks), Olympic champion (1948).
Luis Marsans, 84, Spanish painter.
Louis Martin, 78, Jamaican-born British weightlifter, Olympic silver (1964) and bronze (1960) medallist.
Ghelubhai Nayak, 91, Indian political activist.
Walter Peregoy, 89, American animator (The Jungle Book, Sleeping Beauty, Mary Poppins, The Sword in the Stone).
Tony Ridler, 59, Welsh darts player.
Faith Seidenberg, 91, American attorney and civil rights activist.
Yao Beina, 33, Chinese singer, breast cancer.

17
Bruno Ballarini, 77, Italian footballer (Calcio Como).
Walter Bauza, 75, Argentine Olympic sports shooter.
Joseph Brannigan, 83, American politician, member of the Maine Senate (2006–2012).
Marie Foucher-Creteau, 89, French Olympic swimmer.
Ken Furphy, 83, English footballer and manager (Watford).
Gobinda Halder, 84, Indian lyricist and composer, kidney failure.
Faten Hamama, 83, Egyptian actress (The Angel of Mercy, Wajh al-Qamar).
Don Harron, 90, Canadian comedian, actor and author (Hee Haw, The Big Revue), cancer.
Kazumasa Hirai, 76, Japanese manga author (8 Man, Genma Taisen, Wolf Guy).
Fritz C. Holte, 89, Norwegian economist.
Justin Kili, 61, Papua New Guinean journalist and media personality.
Rebecca D. Lockhart, 46, American politician, Speaker of the Utah House of Representatives (since 2011), Creutzfeldt–Jakob disease.
Henry Manne, 86, American law and economics academic.
Roderick McDonald, 69, American basketball player (Utah Stars).
Terence Miller, 96, British palaeontologist.
Origa, 44, Russian singer (Ghost in the Shell: Stand Alone Complex), lung cancer.
David E. Paulson, 83, American politician, member of the Wisconsin State Assembly for the 28th District (1978–1986).
Greg Plitt, 37, American fitness trainer (Work Out) and actor (Grudge Match, Terminator Salvation, Bobby), hit by train.
Bill Sykes, 75, English author and chaplain.

18
Mohammad Ali Allahdadi, 52, Iranian army general, airstrike.
Vinay V. Deodhar, 66, Indian mathematician.
Maurice Dumas, 87, Canadian politician, MP for Argenteuil—Papineau—Mirabel (1993–2000).
Cynthia Layne, 51, American jazz singer, cancer.
Grazia Livi, 84, Italian author and journalist, Viareggio Prize winner.
D. C. McNeil, 87, Canadian politician.
Alberto Nisman, 51, Argentine prosecutor (AMIA bombing), apparent suicide by gunshot.
Paul O'Grady, 54, Australian politician, member of the New South Wales Legislative Council (1988–1996), cancer.
Muna Obiekwe, 36, Nigerian actor, kidney disease.
Dorothy Barnes Pelote, 85, American politician, member of the Georgia House of Representatives (1993–2003).
Pietro Pianta, 74, Italian footballer.
June Randall, 87, British script supervisor (The Spy Who Loved Me, A Clockwork Orange, The Shining).
Piet van der Sanden, 90, Dutch politician, member of the House of Representatives (1971–1972, 1973–1989), member of the European Parliament (1973–1974).
Milt Schoon, 92, American basketball player (Sheboygan Red Skins).
Harish Chandra Srivastava, 90, Indian politician.
Yasuaki Taiho, 51, Taiwanese-born Japanese baseball player (Chunichi Dragons, Hanshin Tigers), acute myeloid leukemia.
Dallas Taylor, 66, American drummer (Crosby, Stills, Nash & Young), complications of viral pneumonia and kidney disease.
Christine Valmy, 88, Romanian-born American cosmetologist.
Tony Verna, 81, American television producer, invented instant replay, leukemia.
Kjell Arnljot Wig, 90, Norwegian media personality.

19
John Bilezikjian, 66, Armenian oud musician, kidney disease.
Rose Marie Brown, 95, American beauty pageant contestant, Miss Virginia (1939).
Justin Capră, 81, Romanian inventor.
Gordon Dickson, 83, Canadian Olympic marathon runner (1960).
Adam Yahiye Gadahn, 36, American al-Qaeda operative, drone strike.
Vera Gornostayeva, 85, Russian pianist and piano teacher.
Michel Guimond, 61, Canadian politician, MP for Montmorency—Charlevoix—Haute-Côte-Nord (1993–2011), heart failure.
José María Hernández González, 88, Mexican Roman Catholic prelate, Bishop of Chilapa (1983–1989) and Netzahualcóyotl (1989–2003).
Oscar Hayes, 47, American gospel musician.
Arthit Kamlang-ek, 89, Thai general, Supreme Commander of the Royal Thai Armed Forces (1983–1986).
Vladimir Kesarev, 84, Russian footballer (Dynamo Moscow).
Anne Kirkbride, 60, British actress (Coronation Street), breast cancer.
Rajni Kothari, 85, Indian political scientist.
Robert Manzon, 97, French Formula One driver, last surviving racer from first World Championship.
Mark Marquess, 89, Canadian ice hockey player (Boston Bruins).
Reinaldo Oliver, 82, Puerto Rican javelin thrower and Olympic athlete (1952, 1956).
Karl H. Pribram, 95, Austrian-born American neuroscientist and educator, cancer.
Bob Sadino, 81, Indonesian businessman.
Ward Swingle, 87, American musician (The Swingle Singers, Les Double Six). 
Bob Symes, 90, British inventor and television presenter.
Reies Tijerina, 88, American Chicano activist.
Peter Wallenberg, Sr., 88, Swedish financier and industrialist, patriarch of the Wallenberg family.

20
Canserbero, 26, Venezuelan rapper, suicide by jumping.
James L. Fowler, 84, American military veteran, founded the Marine Corps Marathon.
Edgar Froese, 70, German musician (Tangerine Dream), pulmonary embolism.
Melvin Gordon, 95, American business executive, CEO of Tootsie Roll Industries (since 1962).
Lawrence Hogben, 98, New Zealand meteorologist and naval officer.
Anatol Hrytskievich, 85, Belarusian historian.
Graeme Hugo, 68, Australian demographer and geographer, cancer.
Herman E. Lauhoff, 81, American politician, member of the Texas House of Representatives (1974–1981).
Rose Marie McCoy, 92, American songwriter ("It Hurts Me to My Heart", "Don't Be Angry", "Tryin' to Get to You", "It's Gonna Work Out Fine").
Gloria D. Miklowitz, 87, American author.
Wilfride Piollet, 71, French ballerina and choreographer, cancer.
Peter Pontiac, 63, Dutch cartoonist, winner of the Stripschapprijs (1997), liver disease.
Bette Rogge, 92, American radio and television presenter.
William Roffler, 84, American football player (Philadelphia Eagles), pneumonia.
Hitoshi Saito, 54, Japanese judoka, Olympic champion (1984, 1988), bile duct cancer.
Ricardo dos Santos, 24, Brazilian surfer, shot.
Jerome Van Sistine, 89, American politician, member of the Wisconsin State Senate (1977–1993).
James Walker, 41, Australian television writer (Neighbours), diabetes.

21
Abudureheman Abulikemu, 36, Chinese boxer.
George Atkins, 82, American football player (Detroit Lions).
Patricia Berjak, 75, South African botanist.
Marcus Borg, 72, American Biblical scholar and theologian (Jesus Seminar), idiopathic pulmonary fibrosis.
Leon Brittan, 75, British politician, Home Secretary (1983–1985), Vice-President of the European Commission (1999), cancer.
Vince Camuto, 78, American footwear designer (Nine West), prostate cancer.
Emmanuel Carter, 85, Trinidadian politician, President of the Senate (1990–1995), acting President (1990) during the Jamaat al Muslimeen coup attempt.
Frieda Dänzer, 84, Swiss Alpine skier, Olympic silver medalist (1956).
George W. Downs, 68, American political scientist, heart failure.
George Goodwin, 97, American journalist, Pulitzer Prize winner (1948).
Harry Gordon, 89, Australian Olympic historian, journalist and newspaper editor.
Martin Honeysett, 71, British cartoonist.
Frank Hooley, 91, British politician, MP for Sheffield Heeley (1966–1970, 1974–1983).
Waldemar Kmentt, 85, Austrian operatic tenor.
Roy Noble Lee, 99, American judge, Chief Justice of the Supreme Court of Mississippi (1987–1993).
Johnnie Lewis, 68, Liberian lawyer and politician, Chief Justice (2006–2012).
Kemal Monteno, 66, Bosnian singer-songwriter, pneumonia and sepsis.
Keith Rayner, 71, American cognitive psychologist.
Marshall Schlom, 86, American script supervisor (Psycho, Perry Mason, Rain Man), complications from a fall.
Chin Shunshin, 90, Japanese author.
Pauline Yates, 85, English actress (The Fall and Rise of Reginald Perrin).

22
Don Bryant, 73, American baseball player (Houston Astros).
Peggy Charren, 86, American children's television activist.
Wendell Ford, 90, American politician, Governor of Kentucky (1971–1974), member of the U.S. Senate (1974–1999), lung cancer.
Margaret Bloy Graham, 94, Canadian children's book illustrator (Harry the Dirty Dog).
Joan Hinde, 81, English trumpeter and entertainer.
René Jodoin, 94, Canadian animation director and producer.
Tommy Mason, 75, American football player (Minnesota Vikings, Los Angeles Rams).
Fabrizio de Miranda, 88, Italian structural engineer and university professor.
Franco Nicolazzi, 90, Italian politician, MP (1963–1990), Secretary of the Italian Democratic Socialist Party (1985–1988).
Kel O'Shea, 81, Australian rugby league player (Western Suburbs).
Wayne Quinton, 94, American biomedical engineer.
Dacia Valent, 51, Somali-born Italian politician, MEP (1989–1994), myocardial infarction.
Lawrence Paul Zatkoff, 75, American federal judge, cancer.

23
Abdullah of Saudi Arabia, 90, Saudi royal, King (since 2005), complications from pneumonia.
Ernie Banks, 83, American Hall of Fame baseball player (Chicago Cubs), heart attack.
Jalynn Bennett, 71, Canadian consultant and corporate director.
Betty Jane Diener, 74, American politician, Virginia Secretary of Commerce (1982–1986), pulmonary fibrosis.
Marc Dufour, 73, Canadian ice hockey player (New York Rangers, Los Angeles Kings).
Prosper Ego, 87, Dutch activist, founder of the Oud-Strijders Legioen.
Nol Heijerman, 74, Dutch footballer (Sparta).
Simma Holt, 92, Canadian journalist and politician, MP for Vancouver Kingsway (1974–1979).
Barrie Ingham, 82, English actor (The Great Mouse Detective, Doctor Who, A Challenge for Robin Hood).
Nick Koback, 79, American baseball player (Pittsburgh Pirates).
Svein Døvle Larssen, 86, Norwegian newspaper editor.
Alexander Lastin, 38, Russian chess grandmaster.
Pedro Lemebel, 62, Chilean writer, laryngeal cancer.
Les McMahon, 84, Australian politician, member of the Australian House of Representatives for Sydney (1975–1983).
Bud Miller, 91, Canadian politician, member of the Legislative Assembly of Alberta (1971–1986).
M. S. Narayana, 63, Indian Telugu actor, multiple organ failure.
Leon Pense, 92, American football player (Pittsburgh Steelers).
Jackie Selebi, 64, South African police officer, Commissioner (2000–2009), kidney disease.
Frank Sims, 93, American baseball broadcaster.

24
Stig Bergling, 77, Swedish secret service officer convicted of treason, Parkinson's disease and lung ailment.
Robert Bonnaventure, 94, French cyclist.
Peter Bridges, 89, British Anglican priest, Archdeacon of Southend (1972–1977), Coventry (1977–1983) and Warwick (1983–1990).
Link Byfield, 63, Canadian conservative columnist, politician and publisher, oesophageal and liver cancer.
Julio Canessa, 89, Chilean politician and general, member of the Government Junta (1983–1985), Senator (1998–2006).
Otto Carius, 92, German World War II tank commander.
Maria Cerra, 96, American Olympic fencer (1948).
Aisha Chaudhary, 18, Indian motivational speaker and author, pulmonary fibrosis.
Toller Cranston, 65, Canadian figure skater, Olympic bronze medallist (1976), heart attack.
Maria Della Costa, 89, Brazilian actress (Brasileiras e Brasileiros), pulmonary edema.
Floyd Dunn, 90, American electrical engineer.
Johan Ferner, 87, Norwegian sailor, Olympic silver medalist (1952).
Eric Fitzgibbon, 78, Australian politician, member of the House of Representatives for Hunter (1984–1996).
Joe Franklin, 88, American television and radio talk show host, prostate cancer.
 Wilfrido Garay, 71, Paraguayan footballer.
Sir David Graaff, 3rd Baronet, 74, South African businessman and winemaker.
Muhammad Ibrahim Habsade, 62, Somali politician and rebel soldier, diabetes.
Frances Lennon, 102, British artist.
Erkki Lyijynen, 89, Finnish Olympic rower.
V. S. Raghavan, 90, Indian Tamil actor.
Alfred H. Savage, 84, Canadian civil servant, manager of the Toronto Transit Commission (1981–1987).
Joan Serra, 87, Spanish Olympic water polo player (1948, 1952).
Fred Shank, 74, American nutritionist.
Daniel R. Simpson, 87, American politician, member of the North Carolina House of Representatives and Senate, Lewy body dementia.
Peter Westervelt, 95, American physicist.
Toyoko Yoshino, 94, Japanese Olympic athlete.
Tengku Ampuan Tua Intan Zaharah, 86, Malaysian royal, Raja Permaisuri Agong (1965–1970).

25
Zulkifli Abdhir, 48, Malaysian terrorist and bomb maker, shot.
Sir Robert Atkinson, 98, British businessman and naval officer.
Sonny Berger, 92, American baseball player.
Rose Cabat, 100, American studio ceramicist.
Mari Ellis, 101, British writer and women's rights activist.
Pauline Fisk, 66, British author, cancer.
Demetrio González, 87, Spanish-born Mexican actor (Dos Corazones y un Cielo) and singer, complications from a stroke.
Pierre Gosnat, 66, French politician, cancer.
Godfrey Kalimugogo, 71, Ugandan writer.
John Leggett, 97, American writer, director of the Iowa Writers' Workshop, pneumonia.
Giancarlo Ligabue, 83, Italian palaeontologist (discoverer of Ligabueino), Forza Europa politician and businessman.
Sarojini Mahishi, 88, Indian translator and politician.
Richard McBrien, 78, American Roman Catholic priest and theologian.
Bill Monbouquette, 78, American baseball player (Boston Red Sox).
Don O'Hearn, 86, Canadian ice hockey player.
Demis Roussos, 68, Egyptian-born Greek singer ("Forever and Ever").
Ian Towers, 74, English footballer (Burnley, Oldham Athletic).
Ernst Träger, 88, German judge.

26
R. J. Adams, 72, American actor (Rocky IV), heart attack.
José Luis Allende, 88, Spanish Olympic sailor.
Henk Bloemers, 69, Dutch footballer (FC Eindhoven).
Miguel Ángel Cascallana, 66, Spanish Olympic handball player (1972).
Edwin A. Colvin, 87, American politician, member of the Vermont House of Representatives (1975–1982).
Cleven Goudeau, 83, American greeting card artist.
Howard C. Hawkins, 82, American bicycle tool manufacturer (Park Tool).
Stephen R. Johnson, 63, American television and music video director ("Sledgehammer"), cardiac complications.
Begum Kulsum Saifullah Khan, 91, Pakistani businesswoman and politician.
R. K. Laxman, 93, Indian cartoonist, illustrator and humourist, multiple organ failure.
Neil Levang, 83, American musician (The Lawrence Welk Show).
Lucjan Lis, 64, Polish cyclist, Olympic silver medalist (1972).
Lester McCumbers, 93, American fiddler.
Valery Miloserdov, 63, Russian Olympic dual bronze medallist basketball player (1976, 1980).
Sidewalk Sam, 75, American artist.
Lee Spick, 34, English snooker player, liver-related illness.
Charles Thomas, 82, American sprinter and athletics coach.
Tom Uren, 93, Australian politician, member of the House of Representatives for Reid (1958–1990).
Rositsa Yanakieva, 60, Bulgarian politician and chemist, Vice-chairwoman of the National Assembly (since 2014), brain hemorrhage.

27
Wilfred Agbonavbare, 48, Nigerian footballer (Rayo Vallecano, national team), cancer.
Rafael Corrales Ayala, 89, Mexican politician, MP for Guanajuato (1949–1952, 1979–1982), Governor of Guanajuato (1985–1991).
Rocky Bridges, 87, American baseball player (Cincinnati Reds, Washington Senators).
Harriet Elizabeth Byrd, 88, American politician, member of the Wyoming House of Representatives (1981–1988) and Senate (1988–1992).
Arturo Carmassi, 89, Italian sculptor and painter.
Yves Chauvin, 84, Belgian-born French Nobel Prize-winning chemist (2005).
Roger Cowley, 75, English physicist.
Suzette Haden Elgin, 78, American science fiction author and linguist.
Henk Faanhof, 92, Dutch Olympic (1948) and professional road bicycle racer.
Roy Francis, 92, British naval officer and railway engineer.
Ebbe Grims-land, 99, Swedish composer and viola player.
Pierre Hernandez, 86, French boxer.
Warren Hill, 54, American convicted murderer, execution by lethal injection.
Vladimir-Georg Karassev-Orgusaar, 83, Estonian film director.
David Landau, 67, British-born Israeli journalist and newspaper editor (Haaretz).
John T. Myers, 87, American politician, member of the United States House of Representatives from Indiana (1967–1997).
Ronnie O'Reilly, 63, Irish cricket umpire.
José Pereira, 84, Indian Sanskrit scholar, historian and artist.
Joe Rígoli, 78, Argentine actor and comedian (Un, dos, tres... responda otra vez), heart failure.
Joseph Rotman, 80, Canadian businessman and philanthropist, chancellor of The University of Western Ontario.
Al Severinsen, 70, American baseball player (Baltimore Orioles, San Diego Padres).
Bob Shea, 90, American basketball player (Providence Steamrollers).
Charles H. Townes, 99, American physicist, Nobel Prize laureate in Physics (1964).
Gunnar Christie Wasberg, 91, Norwegian non-fiction writer.
Charlie Williams, 67, American baseball player (New York Mets, San Francisco Giants), complications from heart surgery.
Larry Winters, 58, American professional wrestler and trainer, heart attack.

28
Suraj Abdurrahman, 60, Nigerian army officer.
Egon Adler, 77, German Olympic silver medallist cyclist (1960).
Arthur Alarcón, 89, American federal judge.
Mala Aravindan, 76, Indian Malayalam actor.
Francis Bennion, 92, British lawyer.
Alberto Cardaccio, 65, Uruguayan footballer (Danubio, national team), traffic collision.
Lionel Gilbert, 90, Australian historian, author, curator, lecturer, and biographer.
Georg Guggemos, 88, German Olympic ice hockey player (1952).
Don Jones, 91, American artist and art therapist.
Tommie Manderson, 102, British make-up artist (Willow, Alien, The Killing Fields).
Beric Morley, 71, British architectural historian.
Neyko Nenov, 53, Bulgarian major general, Deputy Chief of Defence (since 2014), brain tumor.
Jaswant Singh Rajput, 88, Indian field hockey player, Olympic champion (1948,1952).
Edward Saylor, 94, American World War II veteran, member of Doolittle's Raiders.
Katharine Worth, 92, British drama academic.

29
Maurizio Arcieri, 72, Italian singer (The New Dada, Krisma).
Amparo Baró, 77, Spanish actress (7 Vidas, Siete mesas de billar francés), cancer.
Subhash Ghisingh, 78, Indian politician (Gorkha National Liberation Front), cirrhosis and liver cancer.
Walter Glechner, 75, Austrian footballer (Rapid Wien, national team).
Bernice Gordon, 101, American crossword writer (The New York Times), heart failure.
Terry Hollindrake, 80, English rugby league player.
Kōno Taeko, 88, Japanese writer and critic, respiratory failure.
Cedric Kushner, 66, South African-born American boxing promoter, heart attack.
Noel Lister, 87, British businessman (MFI Group).
Riichiro Manabe, 90, Japanese composer.
José Martins da Silva, 78, Brazilian Roman Catholic prelate, Archbishop of Porto Velho (1982–1997).
Will McBride, 84, American photographer.
Danny McCulloch, 69, English bassist (The Animals), heart failure.
Colleen McCullough, 77, Australian author (The Thorn Birds), renal failure.
Rod McKuen, 81, American poet, singer and songwriter ("Jean", "Seasons in the Sun"), respiratory arrest.
Kel Nagle, 94, Australian golfer, British Open champion (1960).
Paul Panhuysen, 80, Dutch composer.
Derek S. Pugh, 84, British psychologist and business theorist.
Dora Prince, 84, Argentine actress.
Derek Robertson, 65, Scottish footballer (St. Johnstone), cancer.
Doris Schoettler-Boll, 70, German artist.
Tenkoko Sonoda, 96, Japanese politician, member of the Diet (1946–1952).
Ole Sørensen, 77, Danish footballer.
Peter Towe, 92, Canadian diplomat, Ambassador to the United States (1977–1981).
Alexander Vraciu, 96, American World War II Navy fighter ace, Navy Cross recipient.
Len Wyatt, 95, New Zealand cricketer.
Israel Yinon, 59, Israeli conductor.

30
Richard Clark Barkley, 82, American diplomat, Ambassador to East Germany (1988–1990).
Carl Boldt, 82, American basketball player (San Francisco Dons).
Ricardo Bressani, 88, Guatemalan food scientist, heart attack.
Carl Djerassi, 91, Austrian-American chemist, novelist and playwright, liver and bone cancer.
Rose Frisch, 96, American biologist.
Johnny Goodman, 87, British TV producer.
Kenji Goto, 47, Japanese journalist and ISIS hostage, beheading.
Harold Hassall, 85, English footballer (Bolton Wanderers).
John Hopkins, 78, British photographer, activist, and promoter (Notting Hill Carnival, International Times).
Stuart Inder, 88, Australian journalist and publisher, specialist in Pacific Islands affairs.
Ülo Kaevats, 67, Estonian philosopher and politician, Secretary of State (1992–1995).
Jack Kay, 63, American academic and college administrator.
Geraldine McEwan, 82, British actress (Robin Hood: Prince of Thieves, Agatha Christie's Marple), stroke.
John McHugh, 84, American politician, Mayor of Toledo, Ohio (1990–1993), cancer.
Howard Norris, 80, British rugby union player (Wales national team, British Lions).
Richard Richards, 82, American politician, Chairman of the Republican National Committee (1981–1983).
Ben Schadler, 90, American basketball player.
Jerry L. Smith, 71, American politician, member of the Oklahoma House of Representatives (1972–1980) and Senate (1980–2004).
Gerrit Voorting, 92, Dutch professional road bicycle racer, Olympic silver medalist (1948).
Than Wyenn, 95, American actor (Imitation of Life, Splash, Being There).
Zhelyu Zhelev, 79, Bulgarian politician, President (1990–1997).

31
Harith bin Ghazi al-Nadhari, Yemeni militant, drone strike.
Vasco Bendini, 93, Italian informalist painter.
Robert Blees, 96, American film and television screenwriter and producer (Cattle Queen of Montana).
José Manuel Lara Bosch, 68, Spanish media executive, CEO of Grupo Planeta (since 2003) and Atresmedia (since 2012), pancreatic cancer.
Tomás Bulat, 50, Argentine economist and journalist, traffic collision.
Earl Christensen, 95, American politician, member of the Wyoming Senate (1959–1984).
Don Covay, 78, American R&B singer and songwriter ("Chain of Fools").
Vic Howe, 85, Canadian ice hockey player (New York Rangers).
William Klinger, 42, Croatian historian, shot.
Udo Lattek, 80, German football coach (Bayern Munich, Borussia Mönchengladbach).
Gabrielle Poulin, 86, Canadian writer.
Adalberto Arturo Rosat, 81, Italian-born Bolivian Roman Catholic prelate, Bishop of the Territorial Prelature of Aiquile (1986–2009).
Michael Saward, 82, British Anglican priest and hymnist.
Lizabeth Scott, 93, American actress (Dead Reckoning''), congestive heart failure.
Richard von Weizsäcker, 94, German politician, President of West Germany (1984–1990) and Germany (1990–1994).

References

2015-01
 01